Booster may refer to:

Amusement rides
 Booster (Fabbri ride), a pendulum ride
 Booster (HUSS ride), an evolution of the Breakdance ride
 Booster (KMG ride), a pendulum ride

Arts, entertainment, and media

Fictional characters
Booster, a character in the animated television series and the pilot episode film Buzz Lightyear of Star Command: The Adventure Begins and Buzz Lightyear of Star Command
Booster, the Japanese name for the Pokémon Flareon
Booster, a character in the video game Super Mario RPG

Other uses in arts, entertainment, and media
Booster (newspaper), a Chicago newspaper
Booster pack, a packaged set of collectable game cards or figurines that supplements the starter packs

Science and technology
 Booster (electric power), a motor-generator set used for voltage regulation in direct current electrical power circuits
 Booster (rocketry), used in space flight to provide or augment the main thrust in the initial phase of the rocket's flight
 Booster, a co-channel repeater in broadcasting, used to improve signal strength
 Booster, technically an alternative term for an electronic power amplifier, but with slightly different meaning depending on the technical field in which it is used
 Booster dose, or booster shot, in medicine, a vaccination given after a previous vaccination
 Booster engine, extra cylinders on a steam locomotive, driving the trailing truck or a tender truck, to give more power on starting
 Booster pump, a type of compressor
 Explosive booster, a bridge between a low energy explosive and a low sensitivity explosive
 Launch vehicle, a satellite-launching rocket, sometimes informally referred to as a booster 
 Pegasus Booster, a powered hang glider
 Vacuum servo or brake booster, a component in car braking systems

Other uses
Booster, someone who is a member of a booster club
Booster, someone who engages in boosterism 
Booster, someone who engages in theft, specifically to resell robbed goods
Booster seat, a type of child car seat designed to properly position the vehicle's seat belt
Faxe Kondi Booster and Booster Blue, Danish energy drinks

See also